Bhimdatta Panta (Nepali:भिमदत्त पन्त) was a farmer, revolutionary leader and a martyr from Dadeldhura District, of Nepal. He is known for raising a protest in the favour of peasants and oppressed farmers in the Far-Western Region of Nepal, by the landlords "elite Thakuris". He was martyred with the charges of treason by Local Elites on 1953 A.D aged 27. The town Bhimdatta Municipality in Kanchanpur district is named after him (until 2008 the town was named Mahendranagar). A Non-Profit organization was Named by Two farmers leader Dr.  Dev Dhawal  and Bhimdatta Panta as DevDhawal and Bhimdatta Foundation for  Farmers Right and Respect.

Background
Born to Taranath Panta and Saraswati Devi on 10th of Mangshir of Vikram Samvat Calendar, Bhimdatta was educated in India. He then went on to establish schools and pathshala in Far Western Nepal.

Political career
He began his political career with participating in Bharat Chhodo Aandolan as a cadre. He then returned to Nepal and joined Nepali Congress in 2006 BS After dispute with Congressmen, he left to Nepal Communist Party in 2009 BS.

He revolted against Elites by Noon Aandolan (Salt Protest) distributing salts from Bramhadev Mandi to poor peasants. He began armed rebellions against Elites whose mission was to eliminate feudalism, caste-based discrimination and oppression of farmers. His quote in Nepali: कि जोत हलो, कि छोड थलो, हैन भने छैन अब भलो translates to Either plough the fields or leave it, else you may have to pay the cost. The quotation was against landlords of Far Western who oppressed the poor farmers. His army squads were eliminating corrupt government officials and tyrant feudal Thakuris and distributed the salts and foods to farmers. He rose as Robinhood of Far-Western Nepal. The attack was outmatching Nepal Government and a cunning strategy was webbed to bring Indian armed forces to kill Bhimdatta. Bhimdatta 's strategy was unmatched unless exposed by friends. He was killed gruesomely in Jogbudha forest and the Thakuri feudals hung his bodyless head in a market of Dadeldhura. A Nepali movie Bhimdatta was released about his story.

See also 
Martyrs of Nepal
Dashrath Chand

External links
 63 years after murder of Farmer Leader Bhimdatta
 Bhimdatta Panta, Captain Yagya Bahadur Thapa and 22 more martyrs

References

Nepalese revolutionaries
Nepalese martyrs
1926 births
1953 deaths
People from Dadeldhura District